Lemini is a tribe of shining leaf beetles belonging to the family Chrysomelidae and subfamily Criocerinae.

Genera
Lema Fabricius, 1798
Neolema Monrós, 1951
Oulema Des Gozis, 1886

References

External links

Criocerinae
Beetle tribes